David Graham (born 1952, Abington, Pennsylvania) is an American artist photographer and professor at the University of the Arts in Philadelphia.  He currently lives and works in De Pere, Wisconsin.  Embracing popular forms of American photography (the snapshot, family portrait, and vacation photo), David Graham explores contemporary culture through the idiosyncratic nature of the American landscape.  His work is in many collections, including the Museum of Modern Art, New York City; the San Francisco Museum of Modern Art; the Art Institute of Chicago; the Philadelphia Museum of Art; the George Eastman House, Rochester, New York; the International Center of Photography, New York City; and the Brooklyn Museum, New York. He is represented by the Laurence Miller Gallery in New York City, Etherton Gallery in Tucson, Arizona, and the PDNB Gallery in Dallas, Texas.

Selected solo exhibitions
2019   Etherton Gallery, Tucson, Arizona
2015   Wessel + O'Connor, Lambertville, New Jersey
2015   Where We Live, Laurence Miller Gallery, New York, New York
2014   Fabric Workshop and Museum, Philadelphia, Pennsylvania
2014   35 Pictures / 35 Years, Gallery 339, Philadelphia, Pennsylvania
2008	Almost Paradise, Gallery 339, Philadelphia, Pennsylvania
2008	Silver Eye Gallery, Pittsburgh, Pennsylvania
2007   PDNB Gallery, Dallas, Texas
2004	Declaring Independence, Catherine Edelman Gallery, Chicago, Illinois
2004	James A. Michener Art Museum, Doylestown, Pennsylvania
2003	Alone Together, The Print Center, Philadelphia, Pennsylvania
2003   Kathleen Ewing Gallery, Washington, D.C.
2002	Erie Art Museum, Erie, Pennsylvania
2002   Ricco/Maresca Gallery, New York, New York
2002   Paul Kopeikin Gallery, Los Angeles, California
2002   Erie Art Museum, Erie, Pennsylvania
2001	Michener Art Museum, Doylestown, Pennsylvania
2000	Burden Gallery, New York, New York 2000
1999	Institute for Contemporary Art, Philadelphia, Pennsylvania
1999	Snyderman Gallery, Philadelphia, Pennsylvania
1998	Menschel Gallery, Syracuse University, New York 1998
1994	Locks Gallery, Philadelphia, Pennsylvania
1991	Institute for Contemporary Art, Philadelphia, Pennsylvania
1991	Laurence Miller Gallery, New York, New York
1989	Laurence Miller Gallery, New York, New York
1987	Laurence Miller Gallery, New York, New York
1987   International Center of Photography, New York, New York
1986	Allentown Art Museum, Allentown, Pennsylvania
1986   Photographic Resource Center, Boston, Massachusetts
1985	Armstrong Gallery, New York, New York
1985   Cleveland Center for Contemporary Art, Cleveland, Ohio

Selected group exhibitions
2022.  Wisconsin Artists Biennial, Museum of Wisconsin Art, West Bend, Wisconsin
2022   newARTSpace I, newARTSpace, De Pere, Wisconsin
2021.  Through the Lens, James A. Michener Museum, Doylestown, Pennsylvania
2020.  Signs of the Times, PDNB Gallery, Dallas, Texas
2020.  Photographs of the Week, #85, Laurence Miller Gallery, New York, New York
2019   Betwixt & Between, Laurence Miller Gallery, New York, New York 
2018   Architecture Itself and Other Postmodernist Myths, Canadian Centre for Architecture, Montreal, Canada
2017   The Duck & the Document: True Stories of Postmodern Procedures, SCI-Arc & Princeton University, New Jersey
2017   Circles, Laurence Miller Gallery, New York, New York   
2016   Kentucky Captured, Speed Art Museum, Louisville, Kentucky  
2016   Small Things Considered, Laurence Miller Gallery, New York, New York
2016   Tete a Tete, James A. Michener Museum of Art, Doylestown, Pennsylvania
2016   Paris Photo Revisited, Laurence Miller Gallery, New York, New York
2014   Small Things Considered, Laurence Miller Gallery, New York, New York
2013   William Eggleston and his Circle, PDNB Gallery, Dallas, Texas
2012   Man Made Color, Laurence Miller Gallery, New York, NU 
2011   Flora & Fauna, Salt Gallery, Philadelphia, Pennsylvania
2009	Snapshots on the Way to the Real World, University of the Arts, Philadelphia, Pennsylvania
2007	Pink at Perkins: The Contradictory Character of a Complex Color, Perkins Center for the Arts, Moorestown, New Jersey
2006	Second Woodmere Triennial of Contemporary Photography, Woodmere Art Museum, Philadelphia, Pennsylvania
2005	Heartfelt, Florida State University, Tallahassee, Florida
2003	Home, Ricco/Maresca, New York, New York
2003   Maine ASAP, Northeast Harbor, Maine
2002	Elvis, Howard Greenburg Gallery, New York, New York
2002   Re/viewing Photography, University of the Arts, Philadelphia, Pennsylvania
2002   Bucks County Portraits, Doylestown, Pennsylvania
2001	Pretty, Ricco/Maresca Gallery, New York, New York
2001   Family, Laurence Miller Gallery, New York, New York
2001   Murals, Deutsche Bank, New York, New York
2000	Open Ends, Museum of Modern Art, New York, New York
2000   Bienniel 2000, Delaware Art Museum, Wilmington, Delaware
1999	Wonderland, Noorderlicht Fotofest, Netherlands
1998	Four American Photographers, Athens, Greece
1997	BANG! The Gun as Image, Florida State University, Tallahassee, Florida
1997   Las Vegas, Paul Kopeikin Gallery, Los Angeles, California
1996	Howard Finster's Paradise Garden, Fay Gold Gallery, Atlanta, Georgia
1993	Home, Noorderlicht Fotofest, Netherlands
1992	Our Town, Burden Gallery, New York, New York
1991	Pivot, Mostyn Art Gallery, Gwynedd, North Wales
1991   Nuclear Matters, SF Camerawork, San Francisco, California
1990	Landscapes, Rockwell Museum, Corning, New York
1989	Fire Sites, Museum of Contemporary Photography, Chicago, Illinois
1988	Photographic Truth, Bruce Museum, Greenwich, Connecticut
1988   Alteradiants, Austin College, Sherman, Texas

Grants
Pennsylvania Council on the Arts, 2001, 1999, 1997 & 1987
English Speaking Union, Philadelphia, Pennsylvania, Executed in Great Britain 1990 & 1987
ASMP/Nikon Emerging Photographer Award, New York, 1986
National Endowment for the Arts, Washington, D.C, 1984

Monographs
In Plain Sight, David Graham with W.M. Hunt, EyeShot Publisher, 2022Almost Paradise, David Graham, Pond Press, 2008Declaring Independence, David Graham, Pond Press, 2004The Christmas List, David Graham, Quirk Books, 2003Alone Together, David Graham, Pond Press, 2002Taking Liberties, David Graham, Pond Press, 2001Land of the Free, David Graham with Andrei Codrescu, Aperture, 1999Ay, Cuba!, w/Andrei Codrescu, St. Martins Press, 1999David Graham, Past & Present Tense, Lightwork, 1998Road Scholar, w/Andrei Codrescu, Hyperion, 1993Only in America, David Graham, Knopf, 1991American Beauty'', David Graham, Aperture 1987

External links
David Graham Photography
University of the Arts
http://www.laurencemillergallery.com/
http://pdnbgallery.com/SITE/

American photographers
1952 births
Living people
People from Abington Township, Montgomery County, Pennsylvania
University of the Arts (Philadelphia) faculty
People from Newtown Township, Delaware County, Pennsylvania